Flyte are recording artists from London, England, known for their crafted and often confessional songwriting style.

Early years 
Taylor and Supran started playing together when they were eleven at their local comprehensive school. Hill and Berridge joined later; the rest of the band first heard Berridge singing in the London Underground. The band takes its name from Sebastian Flyte of Evelyn Waugh's Brideshead Revisited. After a video of Taylor and Berridge covering Joni Mitchell's "River" went viral, the band signed a record deal with Island Records.

Flyte's first single "We Are the Rain" was released on Transgressive Records on 28 April 2014. The single and B-side "Where Nobody Knows Your Name" were mixed and produced by Dan Grech-Marguerat and released digitally along with a limited run of 7-inch vinyl. The video for "We Are the Rain" was premiered by Michael Cragg on The Guardians music blog. The single received support from Radio 1, XFM, BBC 6Music, BBC London, and Amazing Radio. It was announced in 2013 that the band had been signed by Island Records

The second single from Light Me Up was released on Turned Out Nice / Island Records on 17 November 2014. The single was recorded by Hugh Fielding at the band's own recording facility within Goldmine Studios in Bethnal Green and mixed by Mike Crossey.

The band released two further singles on Island Records: "Closer Together" and "Please Eloise". "Closer Together" was remixed by Bombay Bicycle Club singer Jack Steadman.

Debut album 
In 2017, Flyte flew to Australia to work with Courtney Barnett's producer Burke Reid on their debut album. Focusing on their live performances and the band's four voices around one microphone, they took their production cues from David Bowie, Nick Drake, The Beatles and Lou Reed. The album The Loved Ones was released on 25 August 2017.

Live performances 
Flyte have toured the UK and Europe extensively and supported the likes of The Lemon Twigs and Bombay Bicycle Club.

They have also performed at Jamie Oliver and Alex James' 'The Big Feastival' in 2015. They have also performed at Boardmasters 2018 in Cornwall after having toured in the US.

On 11 November 2019, Flyte played live at the Village Underground in Shoreditch, London. They were supported by Matt Maltese. In attendance were Paul Sheehan and Adam Heley.

Discography

Studio albums

EPs

Singles

References

British indie pop groups